Job 27 is the 27th chapter of the Book of Job in the Hebrew Bible or the Old Testament of the Christian Bible. The book is anonymous; most scholars believe it was written around 6th century BCE. This chapter records the speech of Job, which belongs to the Dialogue section of the book, comprising Job 3:1–31:40.

Text
The original text is written in Hebrew language. This chapter is divided into 23 verses.

Textual witnesses
Some early manuscripts containing the text of this chapter in Hebrew are of the Masoretic Text, which includes the Aleppo Codex (10th century), and Codex Leningradensis (1008).

There is also a translation into Koine Greek known as the Septuagint, made in the last few centuries BC; some extant ancient manuscripts of this version include Codex Vaticanus (B; B; 4th century), Codex Sinaiticus (S; BHK: S; 4th century), and Codex Alexandrinus (A; A; 5th century).

Analysis
The structure of the book is as follows:
The Prologue (chapters 1–2)
The Dialogue (chapters 3–31)
The Verdicts (32:1–42:6)
The Epilogue (42:7–17)

Within the structure, chapter 27 is grouped into the Dialogue section with the following outline:
Job's Self-Curse and Self-Lament (3:1–26)
Round One (4:1–14:22)
Round Two (15:1–21:34)
Round Three (22:1–27:23)
Eliphaz (22:1–30)
Job (23:1–24:25)
Bildad (25:1–6)
Job (26:1–27:23)
A Strong Rebuke of the Friends (26:1–4)
Praise for God's Majestic Power (26:5–14)
Insisting on His Integrity (27:1–6)
Offering to Instruct the Wicked (27:7–12)
The Fate of the Wicked (27:13–23)
Interlude – A Poem on Wisdom (28:1–28)
Job's Summing Up (29:1–31:40)

The Dialogue section is composed in the format of poetry with distinctive syntax and grammar. Comparing the three cycles of debate, the third (and final) round can be seen as 'incomplete', because there is no speech from Zophar and the speech by Bildad is very short (6 verses only), which may indicate as a symptom of disintegration of the friends' arguments. Job's final speech in the third cycle of debate mainly comprises chapters 26 to 27, but in the silence of his friends, Job continues his speech until chapter 31. Chapter 27 can be divided into three parts:
Job restates his insistence on his integrity (verses 1–6)
Job accuses his friends to be among the wicked by going against him (verses 7–12)
Job proceeds to state the future lot of the wicked  (verses 13–23)

Job again insists on his integrity (27:1–6)
After a possible brief pause (see verse 1) Job resumes his speech with a complain that God's denial to provide him justice has greatly impacted Job emotionally so God has made his life bitter (verse 2). Despite all this, as long as he lives, Job persists in his struggle and does not speak deceitfully (verses 3–4). Job uses the "oath formula" for the first time in verses 2–4 to declare his innocence (a longer legal form appears in chapter 31). Job claims a clear conscience with no reproach by his own "heart" ("the core of his being"), so he is still seeking God to vindicate his integrity and righteousnes (verses 5–6).

Verse 1
[Job said:] And Job again took up his discourse, and said:
"Again took up": this unusual introductory statement suggests that Job has stopped speaking after chapter 26 to give Zophar a chance to speak, but when Zophar remains silent, Job continues with his speech.
"Discourse": translated from the Hebrew word , mashal, which characteristically means "proverb; by-word", normally referring to "a brief saying", but can be used for a "discourse".

Job speaks on the fate of the wicked (27:7–23)
This section contains Job's point about the wicked, opened with a strong declaration for those against him (verse 7) and followed by a teaching about the fate of the wicked. Job asks a series of rhetorical questions about the relationship between the wicked and God (verses 8–10) to challenge his friends why they could not see the reality and they became so "vain" or "lightweight" (verse 12; cf. Ecclesiastes 1:2ff). In the subsequent speech, Job states his stand on the fate of the wicked, correcting the error in his friends' statements about the same issue that actually back themselves into the same group as the wicked. According to Job, the wicked will eventually be driven out by God, although for a while they seemingly prosper, and be swept away without pity (verses 20–23).

Verse 8
[Job said:] "For what is the hope of the hypocrite,
Though he may gain much,
If God takes away his life?"
"He may gain much": translated from the Hebrew word , yivtsaʿ, which root verb means "to cut off, break off, gain by violence.” This word could be translated transitively or intransitively—the latter can be read as "when he is cut off", or because the next line speaks of prayer, it is suggested to be rendered as "when he prays" (reading    [yifgaʿ] instead of  [yivtsaʿ]).
"Takes away": translated from the Hebrew verb , yeshel, which is found only here.
The verse has been linked to the words of Jesus "What shall it profit a man, if he gain the whole world, and lose his own soul? or what shall a man give in exchange for his soul?" (Mark 8:36, 37) and to a parable of Jesus "But God said to him, ‘Fool! This night your soul will be required of you; then whose will those things be which you have provided?’" (Luke 12:20).

See also

Related Bible parts: Ecclesiastes 1, Mark 8, Luke 12

References

Sources

External links
 Jewish translations:
 Iyov - Job - Chapter 27 (Judaica Press) translation [with Rashi's commentary] at Chabad.org
 Christian translations:
 Online Bible at GospelHall.org (ESV, KJV, Darby, American Standard Version, Bible in Basic English)
 Book of Job Chapter 27. Various versions
  Various versions

27